Sharafdar Kola may refer to:
 Sharafdar Kola-ye Olya
 Sharafdar Kola-ye Sofla